The action at Accotink was a skirmish fought between a Union Army home guard unit and 200 Confederate States Army partisan rangers under the command of Colonel John S. Mosby in Fairfax County, Virginia on July 15, 1864. One soldier from each force was killed.

Notes

References 
 The Union Army; A History of Military Affairs in the Loyal States, 1861–65 — Records of the Regiments in the Union Army — Cyclopedia of Battles — Memoirs of Commanders and Soldiers. Wilmington, NC: Broadfoot Publishing, 1997. First published 1908 by Federal Publishing Company. Vol. 5. . Retrieved January 20, 2011.

External links

Accotink
Conflicts in 1864
1864 in Virginia
Accotink
July 1864 events
Fairfax County in the American Civil War